Mohammad Bagheri Taj Amir is an Iranian professional runner. He was born in 1998 in Nurabad village of the Lorestan province, Iran. He began his athletic career in his early years, when he won several inter-school competitions. Later on, he entered the provincial competitions. In 2014, he won the championship of the Iranian junior competitions in the 1500 and 800 meters categories. 

He won first place in the Western states competitions of Iran and thus became a member of Team Melli, or the national team of Iran. He broke a 15 year old record in the 1500 meters sprint run, by clocking sixty one seconds. In 2018, Taj Amir won the first place in the four kilometer Desert Trail Championship in the Asian Games in Dubai. In the same year, he participated in the five-kilometer adult category at the Armenian International Competition in Yerevan, and won the runner-up title.

In the winter of 2018 and 2019, Taj Amir was the runner-up and winner of the 10,000 meter event at the Muscat Marathon in Muscat, Oman, respectively.

References 

Iranian male middle-distance runners
Living people
1998 births